Eoophyla euprepialis is a moth in the family Crambidae. It was described by David John Lawrence Agassiz in 2012. It is found in the Democratic Republic of the Congo and Tanzania.

The wingspan is 14–18 mm. The forewings are white with a fuscous or ochreous subbasal fascia and yellow antemedian suffusion. The hindwings have yellow suffusion from before the middle to the dark subterminal line.

Etymology
The species name is derived from Greek euprepes (meaning beautiful).

References

Eoophyla
Moths described in 2012